Asena is a Turkish name and may refer to:

 Asena, is the name of a she-wolf associated with a Göktürk ethnogenic myth.
 Asena Tuğal, Turkish television journalist
 Duygu Asena, Turkish journalist

Turkish-language surnames
Turkish feminine given names